The 2014–15 PGA Tour was the 100th season of the PGA Tour, and the 48th since separating from the PGA of America. The season began on October 9, 2014.

Changes for 2014–15 
One new event was added (Barbasol Championship) and the Sanderson Farms Championship made a return.
Winners of the Arnold Palmer Invitational and Memorial Tournament were for the first time given three-year exemptions and invitations to the next three Players Championships.
For the first time, the conditional status category (126th to 150th in the FedEx Cup) was regularly reshuffled, like the Web.com Tour graduate and past champion categories.

The McGladrey Classic was moved up two weeks from 2014. The CIMB Classic and WGC-HSBC Champions have each been moved back one week from 2014. The Sanderson Farms Championship is now an alternate event to the WGC-HSBC Champions, instead of being an alternate to The Open Championship as in recent years. The new Barbasol Championship was an alternate event to The Open Championship. It also marked the first time the PGA Tour hosted an event in Alabama in 25 years, when the state hosted the PGA Championship. The WGC-Cadillac Match Play was moved back two and a half months to May, and has relocated back to California, its primary home from 1999 to 2006.

Source:

Schedule 
The following table lists official events during the 2014–15 season.

Unofficial events
The following events were sanctioned by the PGA Tour, but did not carry FedEx Cup points or official money, nor were wins official.

Location of tournaments

Money leaders
The money list was based on prize money won during the season, calculated in U.S. dollars.

Awards

See also
2015 European Tour
2014 in golf
2015 in golf

Notes

References

External links
Official site

PGA Tour seasons
PGA Tour
PGA Tour